Troy Glenn Dorsey (born November 19, 1962) is a former U.S. boxer and kickboxer who competed in the bantamweight, featherweight and lightweight divisions. Known predominantly for his indomitable spirit, amazing physical endurance and a propensity to hammer an opponent with a withering constant barrage of punches, Dorsey began his martial arts training in karate and taekwondo, at the age of ten before later making the switch to full contact kickboxing where he was a three-time world champion as well as a gold medallist the WAKO Amateur World Championships in both 1985 (London) and 1987 (Munich). He began dedicating himself to boxing in 1989 and would win the IBF World Featherweight Championship and IBO World Super Featherweight Championship before retiring in 1998.

Early life
Born and raised in Mansfield, Texas, Troy Dorsey began training in karate and taekwondo at the age of ten, eventually reaching the rank of eighth degree black belt. After competing in point karate competitions, he made the switch to kickboxing, fighting under full contact rules.

Career
After a brief and successful run as an amateur kickboxer in 1980, Dorsey soon turned professional and rose to prominence with a one-sided knockout defeat of Santae Wilson for the KICK United States Featherweight Championship and a defense against Jorge Angat in 1983. At the W.A.K.O. World Championships 1985 (London), held in London, England on November 2, 1985, Dorsey won gold in both semi contact and full contact kickboxing in the -57 kg/125 lb division.

His first loss was a controversial split decision against dominant long-time PKA Bantamweight Champion Felipe Garcia in Garcia's hometown of Denver, Colorado in January 1987. They rematched six months later on August 8, 1987, in El Paso, Texas for the ISKA World Bantamweight (-54.5 kg/120.2 lb) Full Contact Championship and Dorsey would conclusively avenge that blemish with a unanimous decision win that ended Garcia's eight-year reign. Dorsey defended his ISKA bantamweight world title with knockouts over Steve Demencuk and Jeff Watt. In his victory over Demecuk, Dorsey would drop Demencuk no less than six times before finally knocking his opponent out in the seventh round. At the W.A.K.O. World Championships 1987 in Munich, West Germany in October 1987, Dorsey again took gold in full contact kickboxing but was only able to manage silver in semi contact, losing out to Oliver Drexler in the final.

On March 18, 1989, Dorsey went up to -60 kg/132 lb to fight Michael Kuhr at a USA vs. Germany event at the Deutschlandhalle in West Berlin, losing a controversial decision after a five-round fight. The following month, Dorsey was scheduled to fight for the Professional Kickboxing Organization (PKO) World Bantamweight (-57 kg/125 lb) Championship in Gothenburg, Sweden against Dennis Sigo but the Swede had broken his hand during sparring just one week prior to the event and Michael Kuhr was asked to take the fight and move down in weight on short notice. Dorsey won by unanimous decision to take his second world title on April 13, 1989.

Having turned professional as a boxer back in 1985, Dorsey won his first title in that sport on August 10, 1989, when he beat Harold Rhodes by technical knockout for the NABF North American Featherweight (-57.1 kg/126 lb) Championship. The two men met each round center ring both firing large volumes of powerful punches until Dorsey dropped Rhodes for a ten count in the final moments of an exciting bout. He then challenged Jorge Páez for the IBF World Featherweight (-57.1 kg/126 lb) Championship in Las Vegas, Nevada on February 4, 1990, losing a controversial split decision.

After a TKO of Bernardo Piñango two months later, Dorsey rematched Páez for both the IBF and WBO World Featherweight titles on July 8, 1990. The bout was scored a split draw and Páez kept the belts. Dorsey would finally get his hands on the IBF featherweight title after Páez vacated it, knocking out Alfred Rangel in round one for the vacant championship on June 3, 1991. He lost it to Manuel Medina two months later.

Dorsey made a brief return to kickboxing in 1994, knocking out Mechell Rochette in San Jose, California to be crowned the ISKA World Lightweight (-60 kg/132.3 lb) Full Contact Champion.

He became a two-time boxing world champion on October 18, 1996, when he forced Jimmi Bredahl to quit on his stool in Vejle, Denmark, taking the IBO World Super Featherweight (-58.9 kg/130 lb) Championship. Dorsey had a tendency to cut easily and saw several of his later fights stopped due to cuts: this subsequently hastened his retirement from the ring in 1998.

Personal life
He has two daughters, Kendra and Shelly, with his wife Leslie.
Troy is also a Brazilian jiu-jitsu Black Belt under Travis Lutter

Championships and awards

Boxing
International Boxing Federation
IBF World Featherweight (-57.1 kg/126 lb) Championship
International Boxing Organization
IBO World Super Featherweight (-58.9 kg/130 lb) Championship
North American Boxing Federation
NABF North American Featherweight (-57.1 kg/126 lb) Championship

Kickboxing
International Sport Karate Association
ISKA World Bantamweight (-54.5 kg/120.2 lb) Full Contact Championship
ISKA World Super Lightweight (-63.5 kg/139 lb) Full Contact Championship
Karate International Council of Kickboxing
KICK United States Featherweight Championship
Professional Kickboxing Organization
PKO World Bantamweight (-57 kg/125 lb) Championship in Gothenburg, Sweden
WAKO Amateur World Championships
W.A.K.O. World Championships 1985 (London) -57 kg/125 lb Semi Contact Kickboxing Gold Medalist 
W.A.K.O. World Championships 1985 (London) -57 kg/125 lb Full Contact Kickboxing Gold Medalist 
W.A.K.O. World Championships 1987 -57 kg/125 lb Semi Contact Kickboxing Silver Medalist 
W.A.K.O. World Championships 1987 -57 kg/125 lb Full Contact Kickboxing Gold Medalist

Boxing record

|-  style="background:#fbb;"
| 1998-07-11 || Loss ||align=left| Gabriel Ruelas || Alamodome || San Antonio, Texas, USA || TKO || 6 || 1:25 || 15-11-4
|-
! style=background:white colspan=9 |
|-  style="background:#fbb;"
| 1997-10-04 || Loss ||align=left| Jesús Chávez || Caesars Atlantic City || Atlantic City, New Jersey || TKO || 7 || || 15-10-4
|-
! style=background:white colspan=9 |
|-  style="background:#cfc;"
| 1997-04-19 || Win ||align=left| Rudy Zavala || Celebrity Theatre || Phoenix, Arizona, USA || Decision (unanimous) || 10 || 3:00 || 15-9-4
|-  style="background:#cfc;"
| 1996-10-18 || Win ||align=left| Jimmi Bredahl || Idraettens hus || Vejle, Denmark || TKO (retirement) || 7 || 3:00 || 14-9-4
|-
! style=background:white colspan=9 |
|-  style="background:#cfc;"
| 1996-04-12 || Win ||align=left| Hector Vicencio || || Dallas, Texas, USA || Decision (unanimous) || 10 || 3:00 || 13-9-4
|-  style="background:#fbb;"
| 1994-10-27 || Loss ||align=left| Eddie Hopson || || Washington, D.C., USA || Decision || 12 || 3:00 || 12-9-4
|-
! style=background:white colspan=9 |
|-  style="background:#fbb;"
| 1993-06-07 || Loss ||align=left| Oscar De La Hoya || Thomas & Mack Center || Las Vegas, Nevada, USA || TKO (retirement) || 1 || 3:00 || 12-8-4
|-  style="background:#fbb;"
| 1993-02-21 || Loss ||align=left| Calvin Grove || Blue Horizon || Philadelphia, Pennsylvania, USA || Decision (unanimous) || 10 || 3:00 || 12-7-4
|-  style="background:#fbb;"
| 1992-10-03 || Loss ||align=left| Jesse James Leija || HemisFair Arena || San Antonio, Texas, USA || TKO (retirement) || 5 || 3:00 || 12-6-4
|-  style="background:#cfc;"
| 1992-05-02 || Win ||align=left| Juan Valenzuela || || Fort Worth, Texas, USA || TKO || 4 || 2:30 || 12-5-4
|-  style="background:#fbb;"
| 1992-02-18 || Loss ||align=left| Kevin Kelley || Paramount Theatre || New York City, New York, USA || Decision (unanimous) || 12 || 3:00 || 11-5-4
|-
! style=background:white colspan=9 |
|-  style="background:#fbb;"
| 1991-08-12 || Loss ||align=left| Manuel Medina || The Forum || Inglewood, California, USA || Decision (unanimous) || 12 || 3:00 || 11-4-4
|-
! style=background:white colspan=9 |
|-  style="background:#cfc;"
| 1991-06-03 || Win ||align=left| Alfred Rangel || Caesars Palace || Las Vegas, Nevada, USA || KO || 1 || 2:37 || 11-3-4
|-
! style=background:white colspan=9 |
|- style="background:#c5d2ea;"
| 1990-11-18 || Draw ||align=left| Tom Johnson || Fort Worth Convention Center || Fort Worth, Texas, USA || Draw || 12 || 3:00 || 10-3-4
|-
! style=background:white colspan=9 |
|- style="background:#c5d2ea;"
| 1990-07-08 || Draw ||align=left| Jorge Páez || Las Vegas Hilton || Las Vegas, Nevada, USA || Draw (split) || 12 || 3:00 || 10-3-3
|-
! style=background:white colspan=9 |
|-  style="background:#cfc;"
| 1990-04-07 || Win ||align=left| Bernardo Piñango || Las Vegas Hilton || Las Vegas, Nevada, USA || TKO || 8 || 0:34 || 10-3-2
|-  style="background:#fbb;"
| 1990-02-04 || Loss ||align=left| Jorge Páez || Las Vegas Hilton || Las Vegas, Nevada, USA || Decision (split) || 12 || 3:00 || 9-3-2
|-
! style=background:white colspan=9 |
|-  style="background:#cfc;"
| 1989-08-10 || Win ||align=left| Harold Rhodes || || Billings, Montana, USA || TKO || 10 || 2:46 || 9-2-2
|-
! style=background:white colspan=9 |
|-  style="background:#cfc;"
| 1989-02-05 || Win ||align=left| Anthony Boyle || Trump Castle || Atlantic City, New Jersey || TKO || 10 || 2:53 || 8-2-2
|- style="background:#c5d2ea;"
| 1988-09-17 || Draw ||align=left| Rogelio Lopez || Dallas Convention Center || Dallas, Texas, USA || Draw || 10 || 3:00 || 7-2-2
|-  style="background:#cfc;"
| 1988-08-12 || Win ||align=left| Alberto Santana || || Pasadena, Texas, USA || KO || 1 || || 7-2-1
|-  style="background:#cfc;"
| 1988-06-10 || Win ||align=left| Fernando Ramos || || Fort Worth, Texas, USA || KO || 3 || || 6-2-1
|-  style="background:#cfc;"
| 1988-05-01 || Win ||align=left| Delfino Perez || Garden City Ballroom || Dallas, Texas, USA || TKO || 7 || || 5-2-1
|-  style="background:#cfc;"
| 1988-01-19 || Win ||align=left| David Moreno || || Fort Worth, Texas, USA || Decision (unanimous) || 8 || 3:00 || 4-2-1
|-  style="background:#cfc;"
| 1987-10-27 || Win ||align=left| Eduardo Rodriguez || || Fort Worth, Texas, USA || KO || 1 || || 3-2-1
|-  style="background:#fbb;"
| 1987-09-29 || Loss ||align=left| Tom Johnson || Premier Center || Sterling Heights, Michigan, USA || Decision (split) || 8 || 3:00 || 2-2-1
|- style="background:#c5d2ea;"
| 1987-04-09 || Draw ||align=left| Darrell Hayes || || Houston, Texas, USA || Draw || 4 || 3:00 || 2-1-1
|-  style="background:#cfc;"
| 1987-03-06 || Win ||align=left| Conrad Sanchez || Will Rogers Memorial Center || Fort Worth, Texas, USA || Decision (majority) || 6 || 3:00 || 2-1
|-  style="background:#fbb;"
| 1986-12-09 || Loss ||align=left| Scott Phillips || || Fort Worth, Texas, USA || KO || 1 || || 1-1
|-  style="background:#cfc;"
| 1985-04-02 || Win ||align=left| Rafael Rodriguez || Gorman's Gym || Fort Worth, Texas, USA || TKO || 2 || 2:15 || 1-0
|-
| colspan=9 | Legend:

Kickboxing record

|-  style="background:#cfc;"
| 1994-04-15 || Win ||align=left| Michel Rochette || Battle of the Masters || San Jose, California, USA || KO || 5 || 
|-
! style=background:white colspan=9 |
|-  style="background:#fbb;"
| 1993- || Loss ||align=left| Khalid Rahilou|| || || Decision || 12 || 2:00 
|-
! style=background:white colspan=9 |
|-  style="background:#cfc;"
| 1992-00-00 || Win ||align=left| Alexi Nachaev || || || KO || 5 || 
|-
! style=background:white colspan=9 |
|-  style="background:#cfc;"
| 1989-04-13 || Win ||align=left| Michael Kuhr || || Gothenburg, Sweden || Decision (unanimous) || 10 || 2:00
|-
! style=background:white colspan=9 |
|-  style="background:#fbb;"
| 1989-03-18 || Loss ||align=left| Michael Kuhr || USA vs. Germany || West Berlin || Decision || 5 || 2:00
|-  style="background:#cfc;"
| 1988-00-00 || Win ||align=left| Jeff Watts || || United States || KO || 3 || 
|-
! style=background:white colspan=9 |
|-  style="background:#cfc;"
| 1987-00-00 || Win ||align=left| Steve Demencuk || || United States || KO || 7 || 
|-
! style=background:white colspan=9 |
|-  style="background:#cfc;"
| 1987-08-08 || Win ||align=left| Felipe Garcia || || El Paso, Texas, USA || Decision || 12 || 2:00
|-
! style=background:white colspan=9 |
|-  style="background:#fbb;"
| 1987-01-00 || Loss ||align=left| Felipe Garcia || || Denver, Colorado, USA || Decision (split) || || 
|-  style="background:#cfc;"
| 0000-00-00 || Win ||align=left| Jorge Angat || || United States || || || 
|-
! style=background:white colspan=9 |
|-  style="background:#cfc;"
| 1983-00-00 || Win ||align=left| Santae Wilson || || United States || KO || || 
|-
! style=background:white colspan=9 |
|-
| colspan=9 | Legend:

See also
List of featherweight boxing champions

References

External links
 

Living people
1962 births
Boxers from Texas
Featherweight boxers
Super-featherweight boxers
Lightweight boxers
World featherweight boxing champions
International Boxing Federation champions
International Boxing Organization champions
American male kickboxers
Kickboxers from Texas
Bantamweight kickboxers
Featherweight kickboxers
Lightweight kickboxers
American male karateka
American male taekwondo practitioners
People from Mansfield, Texas
Sportspeople from Fort Worth, Texas
American male boxers